"" is a song written in 1954 by Soviet composer Vasily Solovyov-Sedoi and poet Mikhail Dudin. It was originally written for the film Maksim Perepelitsa starring Leonid Bykov. The movie itself was released in 1955, and the song has achieved fame and popularity independently of it ever since. To this day it is still used as a so-called drill song (somewhat similar to a cadence call in the U.S. Army). In 1959, Vasily Solovyov-Sedoi received the Lenin Prize for this song.

"" is performed on Victory Day as well as on other military holidays in Russia, Belarus and other former Soviet republics. This song has also been translated into German, Chinese and Korean (DPRK) versions. The German translation, sung by the Erich-Weinert-Ensemble, became the signature Nationale Volksarmee march, «Unterwegs».

Lyrics

Notes

References

External links 
 
 
 
 
 
1954 in the Soviet Union
1954 songs
Russian military marches
Russian military songs
Russian songs
Soviet songs

Songs written for films